Jayakumari is an Indian actress in South Indian films. She was born in 1952 and was a prominent lead actress during the 1960s and 1970s in Tamil and Malayalam films. She was noted for her glamorous roles. She has acted around 50 Malayalam movies. She hails from Chennai, Tamil Nadu. She made her debut through 1968 Malayalam movie Collector Malathi. She had acted opposite famous actors like Prem Nazir in Football Champion, Jaishankar in Nootrukku Nooru and Dr. Rajkumar in Mannina Maga . She acted more than 200 films in variety roles.

Partial filmography
This list is incomplete, you may expand it

Tamil

Nadodi (1966) - Debut in Tamil
Chakkaram (1968)
Sathiyam Thavaradhey (1968)
CID Shankar (1970)
Engirundho Vandhaal (1970)
Patham Pasali (1970)
Anadhai Anandhan (1970)
Maanavan (1970)
Thabalkaran Thangai (1970)
Maanavan (1970)
Malathi (1970)
Meendum Vazhven (1971)
Nootrukku Nooru (1971)
Kettikaran (1971)
Rickshawkaran (1971)
Arunodhayam (1971)
Thriumagal (1971)
Kasethan Kadavulada (1972)
Kannamma (1972)
Varaverpu (1972)
Bathilukku Bathil (1972)
Ganga (1972)
Gauravam (1973) as Kalpana
Thedi Vandha Lakshmi (1973) as Pattuma
Amman Arul (1973)
Ponvandu (1973)
Pookkari (1973)
Maanikka Thottil (1974)
Kalyanamam Kalyanam (1974)
Idhayam Parkiradhu (1974)
Pandhattam (1974)
Vairam (1974)
Pinju Manam (1975)
Thiyaga Ullam (1975)
Chitra Pournami (1976)
Ival Oru Seethai (1978)
Mullum Malarum (1978)
Thunaivi (1982)

Malayalam

Kanalkattakal (1978)
Yakshagaanam (1976)
Kalyana Sougandhikam (1975)
Chattambikkalyaani (1975) as Devi
Rahasyaraathri (1974)
Bhoomidevi Pushpiniyaayi (1974)
Nadeenadanmaare Aavasyamundu (1974)
Panchathanthram (1974)
Football Champion (1973)
Nrithasaala (1972)
Kandavarundo (1972)
Naadan Premam (1972) 
Agnimrigam (1971)
Rathri Vandi (1971)
Collector Malathi (1967)

Telugu
Bala Mitrula Katha (1972)
Manavudu Danavudu (1972)
Sampoorna Ramayanam (1971)
Kalyana Mandapam (1971)
Rangeli Raja (1971) as Gowri
Inti Gowravam (1970)

Kannada

Makkala Rajya (1960) as Debut in Kannada, child artist
Mannina Maga  (1968)
Hoovu Mullu (1968)
Choori Chikkanna (1969)
Bhale Raja (1969)
Bhale Bhaskar (1971)
Kranti Veera (1972)
Hrudaya Sangama (1972)
Professor Huchuraya (1974)
Nanoo Balabeku (1974)
Chamundeshwari Mahime (1974)
Bangalore Bhootha (1976)
Bhale Huduga (1978)

Hindi
Haathi Mere Saathi (1971) 
Yeh Chor Yeh Lutere (1974)

References

External links

Jayakumari at MSI

Actresses in Malayalam cinema
Indian film actresses
Actresses from Chennai
Actresses in Tamil cinema
20th-century Indian actresses
Actresses in Kannada cinema
Actresses in Telugu cinema
Actresses in Hindi cinema